"O Prithibi Ebar Ese Bangladesh Ke Nao Chiney", is a song composed by Ibrar Tipu and has been sung by Ibrar Tipu, Arnob, Mila, Balam, Kona and Elita Karim. The lyricist of the song is Zulfiqer Russell. It is the official welcome song for the 2011 Cricket World Cup. It was released worldwide on February 17, 2011 at welcome ceremony of Cricket world cup 2011 held in Bangladesh.

Background
In 2011, Cricket World Cup was held in three different countries including Bangladesh. The inaugural ceremony was held on February 17 at Bangabandhu National Stadium, Dhaka. The gala program started with a song that highlighted history, heritage, culture and traditions of Bangladesh to the world. Zulfiqer Russell, who pens the lyrics, tried to highlight the Liberation War, Language Movement, Cricket Team, Sunderbans, Cox's Bazar, and various aspects of the world. Composed by Ibrar Tipu, the song features music from classical to folk and danata, from Sanai to the traditional domestic tunes.

References

External links
 Live coverage of the World Cup opening ceremony

Cricket World Cup opening ceremonies
Cricket events official songs and anthems
2011 songs
2011 Cricket World Cup